Henricia oculata, commonly known as the bloody Henry starfish, is a species of starfish in the family Echinasteridae. It is native to northwestern Europe. It was first described as Asterias oculata by the British zoologist Thomas Pennant in 1777, later being transferred to the genus Henricia.

Description
It is rather rigid and the aboral (upper) surface feels rough due to there being numerous low spines under the skin. It is variable in colour, being dark red, brown, purple or yellowish, the outer portions of the arms sometimes being paler than the disc and inner portions. It is very similar in appearance to Henricia sanguinolenta, but tends to have more irregularly arranged dorsal spinelets that are more opaque.

Distribution
The species is found in the northeastern Atlantic Ocean, mainly around the coasts of the United Kingdom and Ireland. It also occurs in Guernsey, Jersey and northern France, and there have been isolated occurrences in Norway and the United States. It is most common on the western coasts of the British Isles and occurs on rock, boulders, stones, shingle, gravel, and shelly substrates.

Ecology
Primarily a suspension feeder, H. oculata consumes suspended organic particles, detritus, sponges, hydroids and bryozoans, but the starfish can supplement these by everting its stomach to feed on other invertebrates. More than 90% of individuals of this species are associated with a parasitic copepod, Asterocheres lilljeborgi.

References

Echinasteridae
Fauna of the Atlantic Ocean
Taxa named by Thomas Pennant
Starfish described in 1777